Mecta is an American corporation in Portland, Oregon, that makes and sells electroconvulsive therapy (ECT) machines.

History
The Mecta ECT machine was developed at Custom Systems in Portland, Oregon, in 1973 by James Fling and the Custom Systems engineering staff, headed by Cliff Moulton. Paul Blachly of the University of Oregon Medical School was the instigator of the research and the medical advisor of the project.  MECTA is an acronym for Monitored Electro Convulsive Therapy. Blachly wanted a device for the treatment of major depression unresponsive to pharmaceuticals that used minimal energy to induce a seizure. ECT machines of the time all used an excessive amount of joules (watt seconds) to achieve a seizure and Blachly believed them to be unsafe.
Custom Systems was sold to Data Design Inc. in 1980. Data Design sold the product design and rights Of MECTA to Gorham and Robin Nicol in mid-1980.

Blachly died in 1977. The design of the MECTA machine was altered after 1980.

Lawsuits
Akkerman v. Mecta was filed in Ventura County, in June 2007. Atze Akkerman alleged deceptive advertising on the part of Mecta, saying that he had not been informed that his memory loss from ECT would be permanent, and his doctor had assured him otherwise based on material that came from Mecta.
The trial court refused to certify a class action suit since the class was overly broad.

In 1989 Imogene Rohovit sued Mecta alleging that her ECT treatment had caused her brain damage. The judge found against Mecta, which then offered a settlement of $105,000.

References

Further reading
Dr. Blachly's works have been published in the Journal of Applied Psychiatry and in many other papers on ECT since the 1960s. A book was published on the subject in 1981, "Multiple Monitored Electroconvulsive Therapy", authored by Dr. Barry Maletzky and James Fling (CRC Press). This book was based on work done by Dr. Blachly et al. and his contribution to the development of MECTA. 
Blachly was one of the first to advocate modified ECT, and his belief in the efficacy of the modified procedure was the impetus for the development of MECTA.  
 Electroconvulsive Therapy: A Programmed Text by John L. Beyer, Richard D. Weiner, and Mark D. Glenn, (1998) published by American Psychiatric Press

External links
 

Medical malpractice
Companies based in Portland, Oregon
Privately held companies based in Oregon
Healthcare in Portland, Oregon
1973 establishments in Oregon